Robert Henry Hurst (1788–1857) was an English Whig politician.  He was Member of Parliament (MP) for Horsham from 1832 to 1841, and from 1844 to 1847.

Hurst was elected to the House of Commons at the 1832 general election.  He was re-elected in 1835 and  1837, but did not stand in  1841 general election.  However his Conservative successor Robert Scarlett succeeded to the peerage in 1844, and Hurst was elected unopposed at the resulting by-election.  He did not seek re-election in 1847.

His son Robert Henry Hurst (junior) was later MP for Horsham.

References

External links 

1788 births
1857 deaths
Whig (British political party) MPs for English constituencies
Members of the Parliament of the United Kingdom for English constituencies
UK MPs 1832–1835
UK MPs 1835–1837
UK MPs 1837–1841
UK MPs 1841–1847